Andrée Marie Clémence Bonhomme (1 December 1905 – 1 March 1982) was a Dutch composer.

Life
Andrée Bonhomme was born in Maastricht and studied music theory and composition at the Maastricht Gielen Music Lyceum with Henri Hermansat and at The Hague. She received a teaching certificate in 1927 and made her debut as a pianist and composer with the Maastricht Municipal Orchestra in 1928. From 1928 to 1940 she took summer courses with Darius Milhaud in Paris.

After completing her studies, Bonhomme worked as a composer and as a pianist with the Maastricht Orchestra, and in 1932 took a position teaching music theory and piano at the Heerlen music school. Bonhomme wrote a number of works and songs on French texts, but her career declined during the World War II, as she refused to sign a "non-Jewish declaration". She was forced to resign from her orchestra position, and performance of her works was restricted to house concerts.

In 1972 she received a royal honor. Bonhomme died in a nursing home fire in Brunssum. A string quartet apparently commissioned by Matty Niël and completed in February 1957 was posthumously premiered at the Limburg Composer Day in 1989. Her papers are housed in the Dutch Institute of Music in The Hague.

Works
Bonhomme composed 51 works from 1920 to 1955. Selected works include:
Drie schetsen, 1928
Pièce en forme de sonatine for violoncello and piano, 1943
Quatre Melodies Tristan Klingsor, 1955
Sheherazade, song cycle, 1960
La Flute de jade
Chansons de flûte
Berceuse
Le tombeau d’Antar

External links 
Collection Andrée Bonhomme in the Netherlands Music Institute

References

1905 births
1982 deaths
Dutch women classical composers
Dutch classical composers
20th-century classical composers
Dutch music educators
Piano pedagogues
Musicians from Maastricht
Pupils of Darius Milhaud
20th-century women composers